Tadepalle is a major Residencial Area of Vijayawada and model town in Guntur district of Indian state of Andhra Pradesh. The town is a part of Mangalagiri Tadepalle Municipal Corporation and part of Tenali revenue division. It is a major south sub urban of Vijayawada and a part of Vijayawada metropolitan area and Andhra Pradesh Capital Region. It is situated on National Highway 16 between Vijayawada and Guntur.

Etymology 

The origin of the name is believed to be related to the Palm tree 'Tathi'  and 'palle' meaning village. Tadepalle is on the southern bank of the Krishna river and Vijayawada city. The canal flowing through the town is named as Madras Kaluva (Buckingham Canal) – as it goes until Madras (Chennai). Tadepalle, along with Tenali was an 'Agraharam' – or endowed land to Sanskrit Scholars during the classical Sri Krishnadevaraya period. The Camp Office of Y. S. Jaganmohan Reddy, Chief Minister of Andhra Pradesh and the YSR Congress Party Central Party office are located in Tadepalle.

Geography 
Total municipality contains hill area and agricultural lands. Buckingham canal flows from north to south in the region. The municipality contains old industrial lands, belongs to EID parry company and cement factory which are not being used for any purpose.

Demographics 

The total population constitutes  males,  females and  under 6 years of age. The sex ratio stands at 1004 females per 1000 males. There are  literates with an average literacy rate of 75.93%, significantly higher than the state average of 67.41%.

Governance 

Tadepalle Municipality was constituted in the year 2009. It is classified as a First Grade municipality and has 34 municipal wards. With the merger of all the 10 villages of the Tadepalli mandal in Tadepalli, the town has a population of 99,248 according to the Census 2011. From March 2021 Tadepalli Municipality is merged in to Mangalagiri-Tadepalli Municipal Corporation

Transport 

APSRTC runs buses from Amaravathi and Vijayawada through this town. The railway station is named as Krishna Canal. It is a junction for Guntur and the Vijayawada divisions.

Education 

The primary education in the town is imparted by means of elementary schools and for secondary education is offered by schools like, Zilla Parishad High School and Ramakrishna Mission High School. It has no notable junior and professional colleges, for which the students depend on the nearby city of Vijayawada.

Notable people 
 Kallam Anji Reddy, the founder of Dr. Reddy's Laboratories

See also 
List of municipalities in Andhra Pradesh

References

External links 

Towns in Guntur district
Mandal headquarters in Guntur district
Towns in Andhra Pradesh Capital Region
Neighbourhoods in Vijayawada